Milton Giménez (born 12 August 1996) is an Argentine professional footballer who plays as a striker for Liga MX club Necaxa.

Club career
Giménez started with Atlanta, having joined from Deportivo Armenio. He made three appearances off the bench across three seasons to start his career, one in each campaign; he featured as a substitute nine times in the subsequent 2016–17. Midway through that season, Giménez was loaned out to Primera C Metropolitana's Ferrocarril Midland. Five goals in twenty matches occurred. Back with Atlanta, Giménez played in fourteen fixtures in 2017–18 as well as scoring five - his first against Comunicaciones was followed by goals versus Almirante Brown, San Miguel, Talleres and Defensores de Belgrano.

In July 2019, after promotion to Primera B Nacional with Atlanta, Giménez completed a loan move to Comunicaciones of Primera B Metropolitana. He netted on his home debut versus San Miguel on 17 August. Fourteen further goals were scored by him in 2019–20, which included braces against Fénix, Sacachispas and Argentino. Giménez returned to Atlanta in June 2020, subsequently scoring three goals in eight games against Ferro Carril Oeste, Estudiantes and San Martín in the second tier. On 18 February 2021, Giménez moved up to the Primera División with Central Córdoba; penning a deal until December.

Giménez scored on his top-flight debut during a victory away from home against Atlético Tucumán on 22 February 2021. He followed that up with a goal in both his next two appearances versus San Lorenzo and Banfield respectively.

International career
Giménez represented Argentina's U23s at the 2016 Sait Nagjee Trophy in India.

Career statistics

Notes

References

External links

1996 births
Living people
People from Malvinas Argentinas Partido
Argentine footballers
Association football forwards
Primera B Metropolitana players
Primera C Metropolitana players
Primera Nacional players
Argentine Primera División players
Club Atlético Atlanta footballers
Club Ferrocarril Midland players
Club Comunicaciones footballers
Central Córdoba de Santiago del Estero footballers
Sportspeople from Buenos Aires Province